This is a list of the main career statistics of professional Bulgarian tennis player Tsvetana Pironkova. She has won one WTA singles title, a Premier-level Sydney International in 2014, while at the ITF Women's Circuit, she has won six singles titles. During the years, she progressed more in singles and made more significant results, reaching semifinal of the 2010 Wimbledon and quarterfinals of the 2011 Wimbledon, 2016 French Open and 2020 US Open. On the WTA rankings, she has place of 31 as her career-high singles ranking, achieved in September 2010, while in doubles she has place of 141, reached in March 2009. As of March 2021, she earned more than $5m prize money.

Career achievements

Pironkova made her WTA Tour debut in 2005, but got first recognized at the 2006 Australian Open, when she made her first top-ten win, defeating Venus Williams in the first round. Then, at the 2008 Italian Open, she reached her first significant quarterfinal, where she also defeated world No. 3, Ana Ivanovic, in the second round. At 2010 Wimbledon, she defeated top 10 Venus Williams in order to reach her first Grand Slam semifinal. The following year, she reached quarterfinal of Wimbledon, but also defeated another top 10 player in that moment, Russian player Vera Zvonareva. At the end of season 2012, Pironkova qualified for her first year-end championships, an elite-level WTA Tournament of Championships (now known as WTA Elite Trophy) and reached semifinal, after defeating Zheng Saisai and losing to Nadia Petrova and Maria Kirilenko in the round-robin group. In the semifinal match, she lost to Caroline Wozniacki in the straight sets.

She had strong start of the season of 2014, reaching and winning her first WTA final at the Premier-level Sydney International. On her way to the trophy, she defeated three top-ten players, Sara Errani and Petra Kvitová and then in the final, Angelique Kerber. At the 2016 French Open, she had another strong Grand Slam performance, reaching her another quarterfinal, after defeating top-ten Agnieszka Radwańska in the previous round. After comeback of three-years absence, Pironkova had strong performance on her comeback tournament, 2020 US Open, where she reached another Grand Slam quarterfinal. There, in the second round, she defeated former world No. 1, Garbiñe Muguruza, but later she lost to Serena Williams in the quarterfinal match.

Performance timeline

Only main-draw results in WTA Tour, Grand Slam tournaments, Fed Cup/Billie Jean King Cup and Olympic Games are included in win–loss records.

Singles
Current through the 2021 BNP Paribas Open.

Doubles

WTA career finals

Singles: 1 (1 title)

ITF Circuit finals

Singles: 13 (6 titles, 7 runner–ups)

WTA Tour career earnings
Correct as of 15 November 2021

Career Grand Slam statistics

Best results details
Grand Slam winners are in boldface, and runner–ups are in italics.

Top-10 wins

Notes

References

Pironkova, Tsvetana